When I Call Your Name may refer to:

 When I Call Your Name (album), a 1989 album by American country music singer Vince Gill
"When I Call Your Name" (Vince Gill song), this album's title track
 "When I Call Your Name" (Mary Kiani song), a 1995 song by Scottish dance singer Mary Kiani